Chicago Artists Coalition is a non-profit artist service organization based in Chicago and dedicated to building a sustainable marketplace for entrepreneurial artists and creatives. As pioneers in advocacy and professional development, it capitalizes on the intersection of art and enterprise by activating collaborative partnerships and developing innovative resources. The Chicago Artists Coalition is committed to cultivating groundbreaking exhibitions and educational opportunities, and to building a diverse community of artistic leaders that defines the place of art and artists in our culture and economy.

History
The Chicago Artists Coalition was founded in 1974 by a group of artists who sought to create a better environment and future for the artistic community living and working in the Chicago area. It was modeled after the Boston Visual Artists' Union, Inc. and officially incorporated in 1975. Historically, the organization has played an important role in artists' professional development and local/regional advocacy. It was instrumental in the establishment of the Chicago Department of Cultural Affairs (now the Department of Cultural Affairs & Special Events); proved vital in advocating for the Percent for Art bill, helped found the Chicago Artists Month, and was involved in the creation of Arts Alliance Illinois, the state advocacy organization.

Since 2010, the Coalition began to grow significantly in its programming and operations, guided by strategic planning initiatives and multi-year capacity-building grants. In 2011, the Coalition relocated to the West Loop neighborhood in downtown Chicago, which is home to many of the city's top contemporary arts galleries and artist-run spaces. The organization currently operates in an 8,000 square foot historic building that contains a lofty gallery/program space, artist residency studios, and administrative offices. In 2012, the Coalition acquired the Chicago Artists Resource website, known as CAR, which expanded the organization's services and outreach to artists working in multiple disciplines.

Programs
The Chicago Artists Coalition's core programs provide educational training, exhibition/residency initiatives and marketplace building for artists and a diverse arts public.
 
BOLT Residency is a competitive, juried, year-long program that provides participating artists with dedicated studio workspace, a solo exhibition, one-on-one studio visits with leading arts professionals, and community-building.

Chicago Artists Resource (CAR) is a comprehensive online platform that connects, educates and empowers artists and the arts community.

Collectors Circle is a special membership level and event series dedicated to building a community of emerging and established collectors who share a strong interest in supporting Chicago art.

FIELD/WORK is a year-round program of workshops, personalized consultations, peer learning exchanges, and tutorials that provides artists of all disciplines and career stages with the skills needed for creative and professional success. The FIELD/WORK Residency is an educational program designed for artists wanting a deeper engagement in vital issues in artists' professional development, critical feedback, and support in designing a pathway to progress with individual career goals.

HATCH Projects is a year-long incubator for emerging artists and curators who collectively produce group exhibitions and related programming throughout the year. This program fosters shared experimentation, exchange, and creativity to produce ground-breaking exhibitions and programs.

LAUNCH Invitational Residency is a professional development residency for recent BA and BFA graduates.  Offered to a limited number of promising students nominated by faculty, the four-day-long experience creates a rigorous environment within which artists learn career-building skills from both professionals and peers.

MAKER Grant is an annual, unrestricted award opportunity for Chicago-based contemporary visual artists who demonstrate a commitment to a sustainable artistic practice and career development.

Special Projects include a variety of partnerships with businesses and other organizations to facilitate commissions and other opportunities for artists. Past examples include installing permanent murals in the 1871 technology incubator; organizing art competitions and exhibitions with Groupon, Patrón Spirits, Chicago Art Loop Alliance, and Taste of Chicago; and facilitating commissions in retail/hotel developments in collaboration with Gensler.

The ANNUAL is a new yearly sales exhibition running concurrently with EXPO Chicago that celebrates cutting edge Chicago-based artists. The Annual creates an accessible forum for emerging collectors to discover affordable new work and engage directly with its creators. This sales exhibition builds upon the success of the satellite art fair EDITION Chicago, which first launched in September 2013.

External links
The Chicago Artists' Coalition
Chicago Artists Resource

Artist groups and collectives based in Chicago